The Court of Criminal Appeals is one of Tennessee's two intermediate appellate courts. It hears trial court appeals in felony and misdemeanor cases, as well as post-conviction petitions.  Appeals in civil cases are heard by the Tennessee Court of Appeals.

The Court of Criminal Appeals was established by the Tennessee General Assembly in 1967. At that time, the court had nine members. Its membership was increased from nine to twelve on September 1, 1996, as a result of action by the General Assembly.

Proceedings
The court's judges sit monthly in panels of three in Jackson, Knoxville and Nashville. The court may meet in other locations as necessary. As an appellate court, there are no juries and the court does not hear testimony from witnesses. Rather, attorneys present oral and written arguments for the court's consideration.

Decisions of the Court of Criminal Appeals decisions may be appealed to the Tennessee Supreme Court by permission. All decisions in capital cases are, however, appealed automatically.

Judges
The judges are elected to eight-year terms. If a vacancy occurs during a judge's term, the governor appoints a new judge to serve until the next August of an even-numbered year, when a state general election is held. The names of incumbent judges up for reelection, including judges appointed to fill vacancies, are listed on the ballot without opposition. They are retained or rejected based on a "yes-no" vote. (See Tennessee Plan.)

The twelve judges sitting on the Court as of September 2022 are:

J. Ross Dyer – Western Section
Timothy L. Easter – Middle Section
Alan E. Glenn – Western Section
 Robert L. Holloway Jr. - Middle Section
Camille R. McMullen - Western Section
Robert H. Montgomery Jr. - Eastern Section
Norma McGee Ogle – Eastern Section
D. Kelly Thomas – Eastern Section
Robert W. Wedemeyer – Middle Section
James Curwood Witt – Eastern Section
Thomas T. Woodall – Middle Section

References
Intermediate Appellate Courts in the Tennessee Blue Book

State appellate courts of the United States
Tennessee state courts
Courts and tribunals established in 1967
1967 establishments in Tennessee